The Bede BD-1 was a two-seat, single-engine, low-wing monoplane, the first design of American aeronautical engineer Jim Bede. The BD-1 was designed in 1960 as a kit-built aircraft intended for home assembly by amateur builders. Design goals included a kit price of $US 2500, including a rebuilt 100 hp (75 kW) engine and a cruise speed of 130 knots (240 km/h). The prototype N624BD first flew in 1962.

No kits were sold however, and it was not until Bede had been removed from the company and the design was reworked - including the removal of the folding wing feature - that it entered production as the American Aviation AA-1.

Design

The BD-1 was a low-wing monoplane of all-metal construction, utilizing aluminium honeycomb construction and a laminar flow wing. The aircraft was predominantly of bonded, rather than riveted, construction. It featured a sliding canopy and two seats. The aircraft was designed to be towed behind a car to allow it to be stored at home in a garage and thus reduce hangarage costs. To facilitate this goal the aircraft had folding wings and a horizontal stabilizer of less than 8 foot (2.4 m) width. It was designed to be fully aerobatic as well and was stressed for 9g (90 m/s²).

Many parts of the BD-1 were interchangeable to simplify production. For example, the wings were interchangeable as were the fin and horizontal tail. The ailerons and flaps were interchangeable and the rudder and elevators were also. Many aerodynamic and handling compromises were made to achieve this commonality of parts and trailer-ability.

The aircraft was intended to be offered with a variety of new or rebuilt engines. Rebuilt engines were to be available to reduce the purchase price.

Development
The BD-1 was never developed beyond prototype stage and no kits were produced. The company Bede founded to produce the BD-1 kits, Bede Aviation Corporation, eventually became American Aviation and they pursued FAA certification under FAR 23 for the design so that completed aircraft could be sold. Due to financial problems Bede was forced out of the company and the BD-1 was redesigned.

During the redesign process the aircraft was modified so that the wings did not fold, making it easier to achieve certification. Other changes included a longer wing to improve rate of climb, an anti-servo tab on the elevator along with an elevator centering spring system to increase longitudinal stability and stall strips to improve the stall performance. The resulting aircraft entered production in the fall of 1968 as the 1969 model American Aviation AA-1 Yankee Clipper.

While the BD-1 never did enter production itself, it has had a lasting impact on light aircraft production and spawned a whole series of  offspring designs including the Grumman American AA-1, AA-5, and Gulfstream American GA-7 Cougar.
The ultimate derivative design, the Tiger Aircraft AG-5B Tiger, was produced until 2006 by Tiger Aircraft.

Specifications (BD-1)

See also

References

 BD-1 Pilot Evaluation Report from 1965
 BD-1 Sales brochure and pictures

External links
 Photo of BD-1 prototype N624BD

BD-001
1960s United States sport aircraft
Single-engined tractor aircraft
Low-wing aircraft
Homebuilt aircraft
Aircraft first flown in 1963